Alison Margaret Knowles (born 27 March 1982 in Bournemouth) is a British rower who competed at the 2008 Summer Olympics.

Rowing career
Knowles competed in the women's eight at the 2008 Olympic Games but could not row in the final due to illness.

She was part of the British squad that topped the medal table at the 2011 World Rowing Championships in Bled, where she won a bronze medal as part of the eight with Jo Cook, Jessica Eddie, Louisa Reeve, Natasha Page, Lindsey Maguire, Katie Greves, Victoria Thornley and Caroline O'Connor.

References

External links
 
 
 
 

1982 births
Living people
English female rowers
Sportspeople from Bournemouth
Rowers at the 2008 Summer Olympics
Olympic rowers of Great Britain
World Rowing Championships medalists for Great Britain